FK Partizan may refer to:

FK Partizan Belgrade
FK Partizan Bumbarevo Brdo
FK Partizan Kosovska Mitrovica
FK Partizan Momišići

See also
FK Partizani Tirana
FC Partizan (disambiguation)
NK Partizan (disambiguation)
TJ Partizán Domaniža
Partizán Bardejov